San Giorgio (L 9892) is the lead ship of the  of the Italian Navy.

Development and design 

They are included in the Projection Force from the Sea, the amphibious component of the Italian Armed Forces.

Construction and career
San Giorgio was laid down on 27 May 1985 and launched on 21 February 1987 by Fincantieri at Riva Trigoso. She was commissioned on 13 February 1988. 

In mid-2006, the Italian Navy was one of the first to intervene in the Lebanon War. The ships landed in the port of Beirut, under the control of the 1st San Marco Regiment, tons of material intended for the population, field kitchens, ambulances, generators for the production of electricity, pneumatic tents, tons of medicines and tons of food. food intended for the non-combatant civilian population made available by the Ministry of Foreign Affairs, the Civil Protection, the Italian Red Cross and the United Nations World Food Program. 

On 3 August 2016, in addition to fighting smugglers and human traffickers, they have received two additional tasks: the training of the Libyan Coast Guard, the Libyan Navy and the control of the arms embargo towards Libya in accordance with the resolutions of the UN Security Council. Italy will play a decisive role, since the training will be under Italian guidance and will take place onboard San Giorgio, where the first stages of the training of the Libyan Navy will take place already in September. 

Rear Admiral Frumento replaced his Greek counterpart Theodoros Mikropoulos who had been in command since October 19, 2020. He operated aboard the San Giorgio which became the new flagship.

Gallery

References

1987 ships
San Giorgio-class amphibious transport docks
Ships built by Fincantieri
Ships built in Italy